Senator McConkie may refer to:

Oscar W. McConkie Jr. (born 1926), Utah State Senate
Oscar W. McConkie (1887–1966), Utah State Senate